Furona corniculata is a species of beetle in the family Cerambycidae. It was described by Henry Walter Bates in 1885. It is known from Panama and Honduras.

References

Onciderini
Beetles described in 1885